Birger Ljungberg (7 June 1884 – 20 April 1967) was a Norwegian military officer and politician from the Conservative Party who served as Minister of Defence from 1939–1942.

References 

1884 births
1967 deaths
Norwegian Army World War II generals
Defence ministers of Norway